Ickenham Marsh is an area of grassland and marsh in the London Borough of Hillingdon. It is managed as a nature reserve by London Wildlife Trust.

References

External links
 LB Hillingdon Green Spaces
 LB Hillingdon Parks and open spaces

Parks and open spaces in the London Borough of Hillingdon
Nature reserves in the London Borough of Hillingdon
London Wildlife Trust